The 1895 New York state election was held on November 5, 1895, to elect the Secretary of State, the State Comptroller, the Attorney General, the State Treasurer, the State Engineer and a judge of the New York Court of Appeals, as well as all members of the New York State Assembly and the New York State Senate. Besides, the voters were asked if they approved of the State's issuing bonds for $9,000,000.00 to spend on canal improvements, which the electorate answered in the affirmative.

History
The Socialist Labor state convention met on July 6 at Troy, New York, and nominated Erasmus Pellenz, of Syracuse, for Secretary of State; Patrick Murphy, of New York City, for Comptroller; William F. Steer, of Albany, for Treasurer; Morris Berman, of Monroe County, for State Engineer; John H. Moore, of Staten Island, for Attorney General; and Henry Gray, of Westchester County, for the Court of Appeals.

The Republican state convention met on September 17 at Saratoga Springs, New York. The incumbent state officers, elected in 1893, were re-nominated, and Celora E. Martin was nominated for the Court of Appeals.
 
The Democratic state convention met on September 24 and 25 at Syracuse, New York. Perry Belmont was Tempoarary Chairman until the choice of Ex-Governor Roswell P. Flower (in office 1892–1894) as Permanent Chairman. John D. Teller for the Court of Appeals, and Horatio C. King for Secretary of State, were nominated by acclamation. John B. Judson was nominated for Comptroller on the first ballot (vote: Judson 311, John E. Ashe 99). Norton Chase for Attorney General, and De Witt C. Dow for Treasurer, were nominated by acclamation. Russell R. Stuart was nominated for State Engineer during the first ballot.

Lawrence J. McParlin was nominated by the People's Party for Attorney General, but declined to run. He ran instead for Surrogate of Niagara County.

Results
The whole Republican ticket was elected. This was one of the very rare occasions when all incumbent state cabinet officers were re-nominated and re-elected.

The incumbents Palmer, Roberts, Hancock, Colvin and Adams were re-elected.

Obs.: "Defective, blank and scattering" votes:  19,618 (Comptroller); 19,536 (Secretary)

Due to the adoption of the new State Constitution in 1894, the state officers and state senators were elected for an exceptional three-year term to serve 1896 to 1898, so that from 1898 on the Governor, the state officers and the state senators would be elected at the same time and serve concurrently a two-year term. Thus, this was the last regular election of state officers in an odd-numbered year. Until 1938, in odd-numbered years only the members of the New York State Assembly (which continued to serve a one-year term) were elected, and vacancies were filled, including the judgeships of the New York Court of Appeals which did not occur regularly but depended on the birth year of the incumbents (if age-limited), the year when elected (if the term expired), deaths in office, or resignations.

Notes

Sources
The tickets: STATE ELECTIONS NOV. 5 in NYT on October 28, 1895
The Republican candidates: STATE OFFICERS ELECTED; Sketches of Republicans Who Were Victorious in New-York in NYT on November 6, 1895
The Democratic candidates: SKETCHES OF THE CANDIDATES in NYT on September 26, 1895
Result in Westchester County: CORRECT VOTE OF WESTCHESTER in NYT on November 8, 1895
Result in New York City: VOTE AT LAST ELECTION in NYT on November 26, 1895
Result for Secretary of State and Comptroller, with estimated number in Kings County: THE TOTAL VOTE OF NEW YORK STATE in NYT on December 6, 1895
Result: The Tribune Almanac 1896
Vote totals from The New York Red Book 1896

See also
New York state elections

1895
1895 New York (state) elections
November 1895 events